James Anthony "Seamie" Heffernan (born 17 July 1972) is an Irish  flat racing jockey who rides mainly for horse racing trainer Aidan O'Brien. From a family with no racing connections Heffernan was introduced to the sport when he took a summer holiday job with the National Hunt trainer Arthur Moore. He began his racing career as an apprentice jockey for P J Finn and rode his first winner on 10 August 1988 at the age of sixteen. When Finn retired he moved to the yard of Jim Bolger and shared the Irish champion apprentices title in 1994. He was runner-up in the same competition in 1995 and moved to Aidan O'Brien's Ballydoyle stable in 1996 where he was second jockey after Christy Roche.

Heffernan has remained at Ballydoyle since then and rode his first Group One winner on Beckett in the 2000 National Stakes and his first Classic winner on Imagine in the Irish 1,000 Guineas in 2001. He has ridden a further nine Irish Classic winners, including four victories in the Irish Derby, in addition to riding the Epsom Derby runner-up in 2009 and 2010. He scored his first English Classic victory when Was won the 2012 Epsom Oaks. In 2019, Heffernan rode Anthony Van Dyck under trainer Aidan O'Brien to win his first Derby victory.

He has two children.

Major wins

 Ireland
 Irish Oaks – (1) – Seventh Heaven (2016)
 Irish 1,000 Guineas - (5) - Imagine (2001), Halfway to Heaven (2008), Misty for Me (2011), Peaceful (2020), Empress Josephine (2021)
 Irish Champion Stakes - (3) - Cape Blanco (2010), So You Think (2011), Magical (2020) 
 Irish Derby – (4) – Soldier of Fortune (2007), Frozen Fire (2008), Capri (2017), Santiago (2020)
 Irish St. Leger – (1) – Septimus (2008)
 Moyglare Stud Stakes - (3) - Again (2008), Misty for Me (2010), Minding (2015)
 National Stakes - (2) - Beckett (2000), Power (2010)
 Phoenix Stakes - (2) - Pedro the Great (2012), Caravaggio (2016)
 Pretty Polly Stakes - (3) - Misty for Me (2011), Diamondsandrubies (2015), Magical (2020)
 Tattersalls Gold Cup - Lancaster Bomber (2018)

 France
 Critérium International - (1) - Mount Nelson (2006)
 Prix de l'Opéra - (1) - Rhododendron (2017)

 Great Britain
 Cheveley Park Stakes – (1) – Brave Anna (2016)
 Eclipse Stakes – (1) – So You Think (2011)
 Epsom Derby - (1) - Anthony Van Dyck (2019)
 Epsom Oaks – (1) – Was (2012)
 International Stakes - (2) - Flying the Flag (2013), Mekong River (2014)
 Middle Park Stakes – (2) – Crusade (2011), US Navy Flag (2017)
 Sun Chariot Stakes – (1) – Halfway to Heaven (2008)

 United States
 Breeders' Cup Turf - (1) - Highland Reel (2016)
 Secretariat Stakes - (1) - Highland Reel (2015)

References

Irish jockeys
1972 births
Living people